Andrew Charlton (born 1979) is an Australian politician and economist who has been Member of Parliament for the division of Parramatta since 2022.

Charlton has been described as a "centrist, evidence-based, data-driven economist with entrepreneurial flair". He is the author of Ozonomics and co-author of Fair Trade for All with Joseph Stiglitz.

Early life and education
Andrew Charlton was born in Sydney, New South Wales in 1979. Charlton won the university medal for economics at the University of Sydney, where he was a resident of St Paul's College, and as a Rhodes Scholar received a PhD in economics from the University of Oxford.

Career

Economic adviser
From December 2007 to June 2010, Charlton served as the chief economic adviser to Prime Minister Kevin Rudd. This period coincided with the global financial crisis, during which Charlton played a role alongside Rudd in overseeing Australia's response to the crisis, in which he established a reputation as one of the most innovative and gifted economists in Australia.

Business
In 2015, Charlton founded AlphaBeta Advisors, a consulting and technology firm and served as its director until it was acquired by Accenture in February 2020. Charlton was subsequently named Accenture's Sustainability Services Lead for Growth Markets.

Member of Parliament

Nomination as Labor candidate
Following the retirement of his predecessor Julie Owens, Charlton was nominated as the Labor candidate by party officials, which is said to have ignited anger "among local branches and multicultural communities". Labor leader Anthony Albanese supported Charlton's candidacy.

Election result
Charlton secured more than 25,000 first preference votes at the 2022 federal election. He claimed victory on the day of the election following concession by his opponent, Maria Kovacic.

Personal life
He is married to barrister Phoebe Arcus, with whom he has three children. Charlton is a member of the Labor Right faction.

Charlton moved from a $16 million home in Bellevue Hill and purchased a house in North Parramatta in May 2022 to be more connected with the electors in the division of Parramatta. 

However, this persisted as a topic of controversy after the election when rumours circulated that Charlton’s family remained in the affluent Eastern suburbs while he resides part time in Parramatta’s luxurious Meriton apartments, instead electing to rent out the North Parramatta home.

References

 



1979 births
21st-century Australian politicians
Australian economists
Alumni of the University of Oxford
Australian Labor Party members of the Parliament of Australia
Labor Right politicians
Living people
Members of the Australian House of Representatives for Parramatta
Politicians from Sydney
University of Sydney alumni
Date of birth missing (living people)